An enamel fracture, or chip, is a complete fracture of the tooth enamel without the involvement of the dentine and pulp. A fracture occurs when a tooth contacts a hard object with enough force to break a section of enamel. Chips form with minimal plastic deformation since enamel is strong but brittle. A fracture typically occurs as an irregular break on the occlusal edge of the enamel, and is therefore different to other forms of tooth wear that leave smooth surfaces. Pulp sensibility testing is recommended to confirm pulpal health. Treatment depends on the size of the fractures. If a tooth fragment is still available, it can be bonded to the tooth. For small or minor fractures, it can be smoothed to remove  rough margins and edges. For a larger or major fractures, dental composite resin can be used to mask the defective enamel for aesthetic purpose. In archaeological samples enamel fractures can give insight into the diet and behaviour of past populations.

References

Acquired tooth disorders
Emergency medicine